São Lourenço da Serra (Portuguese for "Saint Lawrence of the mountain") is a suburban municipality in the southeastern part of the state of São Paulo in Brazil. It is part of the Metropolitan Region of São Paulo. The population is 15,978 (2020 est.) in an area of 186.46 km². The southern part of the municipality is heavily forested with the Serra do Mar mountain range, the central and the northern parts are predominantly hilly and partially urbanized.

The neighborhood of Itapecerica da Serra became a separate municipality in 1991.

Population history

References

External links
  http://www.saolourencoserra.sp.gov.br
  citybrazil.com.br

Populated places established in 1993
Municipalities in São Paulo (state)